Alexander Finlay (14 November 1887 – 2 March 1963) was an Australian politician. Born in the South Yarra neighborhood of Melbourne, Victoria, he moved to Adelaide, South Australia as a child and attended school there until the age of twelve. He then became a carriage painter like his father. He married at age twenty-two and had three children.

In 1918 Finlay enlisted in the Australian Imperial Force, serving in France and Great Britain. After his discharge in 1919, he returned home to Bowden, a suburb of Adelaide. There he joined The Returned Sailors and Soldiers Imperial League of Australia. In the 1920s and 1930s he held several offices in the Australian Natives' Association and in a coachmakers' union later known as the Vehicle Builders' Employees' Federation of Australia. He eventually became president of the coachmakers' union, and then from 1934 to 1944 general secretary of its South Australian branch. In that position, he negotiated the union's strike-free agreements with the automobile manufacturer General Motors-Holden.

Finlay attempted to be preselected as a Senate candidate for the Labor Party in 1937 and 1939. He was chosen for the Labor Senate ticket in 1940, but lost the election. In 1943 he shared the Labor Senate ticket with Sid O'Flaherty and Theo Nicholls. All three were elected. Finlay held his Senate seat until he retired in 1953. He died in 1963 in Brighton, a beachfront suburb of Adelaide.

References

Australian Labor Party members of the Parliament of Australia
Members of the Australian Senate for South Australia
Members of the Australian Senate
1887 births
1963 deaths
20th-century Australian politicians